Cheng Xiaonong (born 19 February 1952) is a Chinese-American author.

Biography
Cheng was born in Shanghai on February 19, 1952. After middle school, Cheng was sent to Feidong County to work as a farmer.

In 1975, Cheng worked in Anhui Geologic Branch. Resumption of University Entrance Examination in 1977, Cheng moved to Beijing, he was a graduate student of Renmin University, and he holds an M.A. in economics from Renmin University in 1985.

After graduation, Cheng served as a researcher of the office of the Standing Committee of the National People's Congress and the Deputy Director of the Research Institute of China Economic System Reform.

In 1989, Cheng became a visiting scholar at University of Göttingen and Princeton University, he earned a doctorate in sociology from Princeton University.

From 1997 to present, Cheng served as the chief editor of Modern China Studies.

References

1952 births
Living people
Writers from Shanghai
University of Göttingen alumni
Princeton University alumni
Renmin University of China alumni
People's Republic of China economists
People's Republic of China writers
Economists from Shanghai